The Vyg is a river in Republic of Karelia. Consists of the Upper Vyg, 135 km long, discharging into Lake Vygozero, and the Lower Vyg, 102 km long, flowing from Lake Vygozero and discharging into Onega Bay of the White Sea near Belomorsk. The Upper Vyg flows through several small lakes in a swampy land. The Lower Vyg is controlled by several dams as a part of the White Sea-Baltic Canal.

Rivers of the Republic of Karelia